Thomas Rupprath (born 16 March 1977 in Neuss) is an Olympic swimmer from Germany, who is nicknamed "The New Albatross".

Biography
He held the world record for the 50 m backstroke (short course) with a time of 23.27 seconds set on 31 November 2002. This was broken by Robert Hurley of Australia on 26 October 2008. He also held the 50 m backstroke (long course) record between 7 July 2003 to 2 April 2008 with a time of 24.80 s.

With a time of 54.16 over 100 m backstroke (second behind Helge Meeuw) Thomas Rupprath managed to qualify for the Olympic Games in Beijing. He also won the 100 m butterfly at the German trials.

Achievements
Olympic Games
 Bronze medal in 2000 Sydney
 Silver medal in 2004 Athens

World championships
 Silver medal at 2007 Melbourne

World Championships SC
 Gold medal at 2004 Indianapolis
 Silver medal at 2000 Athens
 Silver medal at 2006 Shanghai

See also
 List of German records in swimming
 World record progression 50 metres backstroke
 World record progression 100 metres backstroke

References

External links
 

1977 births
Living people
Sportspeople from Neuss
Swimmers at the 2000 Summer Olympics
Swimmers at the 2004 Summer Olympics
Swimmers at the 2008 Summer Olympics
German male freestyle swimmers
Olympic swimmers of Germany
German male backstroke swimmers
German male butterfly swimmers
Olympic silver medalists for Germany
Olympic bronze medalists for Germany
World record setters in swimming
Olympic bronze medalists in swimming
World Aquatics Championships medalists in swimming
Medalists at the FINA World Swimming Championships (25 m)
European Aquatics Championships medalists in swimming
Medalists at the 2004 Summer Olympics
Medalists at the 2000 Summer Olympics
Olympic silver medalists in swimming
Ich bin ein Star – Holt mich hier raus! participants